Wheatacre is a civil parish in the English county of Norfolk.
For the purposes of local government, it falls within the district of South Norfolk

The villages name means 'Wheat land'.

See also 
 Clavering hundred

Notes

External links

South Norfolk
Villages in Norfolk
Civil parishes in Norfolk